The 2019 ICC Women's Qualifier Africa was a cricket tournament that was held in Zimbabwe in May 2019. The matches in the tournament were played as Women's Twenty20 Internationals (WT20Is), with the top team progressing to both the 2019 ICC Women's World Twenty20 Qualifier and the 2021 Women's Cricket World Cup Qualifier tournaments. Uganda won the previous Africa qualifier tournament, when it was held in Windhoek in 2017.

The fixtures took place at Harare Sports Club, Old Hararians and Takashinga Cricket Club in Harare. The teams in the Qualifier are split into two groups, with the winner of each group progressing to the final on 12 May 2019. All the squads were confirmed on 1 May 2019.

Namibia were undefeated in Group B to progress to the final of the qualifier tournament. Zimbabwe were also undefeated in winning Group A, to join Namibia in the qualifier's final. Zimbabwe beat Namibia by 50 runs in the final to win the tournament.

However, in July 2019, the International Cricket Council (ICC) suspended Zimbabwe Cricket, with the team barred from taking part in ICC events. The following month, with Zimbabwe banned from taking part in international cricket tournaments, the ICC confirmed that Namibia would replace them in the 2019 ICC Women's World Twenty20 Qualifier tournament.

Teams
The following teams competed in the tournament:

Fixtures

Group A

Group B

Final

References

External links
 Series home at ESPN Cricinfo

 
 
2019 in women's cricket
International women's cricket competitions in Zimbabwe
International cricket competitions in 2019
2019 in Zimbabwean cricket
2019 in Zimbabwean women's sport